Below is a list of nominations and appointments to the Department of Homeland Security by Joe Biden, the 46th president of the United States. , according to tracking by The Washington Post and Partnership for Public Service, 13 nominees have been confirmed, 5 positions do not have nominees, 16 appointments have been made to positions that do not require Senate confirmation, and 2 positions do not have appointees.

Color key 
 Denotes appointees awaiting Senate confirmation.

 Denotes appointees serving in an acting capacity.

 Denotes appointees who have left office or offices which have been disbanded.

Leadership

Office of the Secretary

Under Secretaries of Homeland Security

Assistant Secretaries of Homeland Security

Federal Emergency Management Agency

Law Enforcement Agencies

DHS Agencies & Administrations

DHS Task Forces

Withdrawn nominations

See also 
 Cabinet of Joe Biden, for the vetting process undergone by top-level roles including advice and consent by the Senate

Notes 

Confirmations by roll call vote

Confirmations by voice vote

References 

 Biden
Homeland Security